Charles Isidore Hemans (1817–1876) was an English antiquary.

Hemans, youngest son of Felicia Dorothea Hemans, poet, was born in 1817. He was a handsome boy and the especial favourite of his mother. He accompanied her in a visit to Abbotsford in 1829, and was with her at the time of her death in 1835.

He left England early in life, and, after residing in various places on the continent, finally settled in Rome and made Roman history and archæology his chief study. He was the originator in 1846 of the ‘Roman Advertiser,’ the first English paper published in the city. He helped to establish the English Archæological Society there in 1865, and afterwards became its honorary secretary and librarian. To English visitors in Rome and to English residents he was always a friendly guide, noted for his amiability and modesty, and his writings are invaluable to students of Italian ecclesiastical history and archæology. After a serious illness at Spezia in the summer of 1875 he removed to Bagni di Lucca, where he died on 26 Oct. 1876. He was buried in the English cemetery there.

Hemans was the author of: 
 ‘Catholic Italy,’ pt. i. Rome and Papal States, 1860. 
 ‘The Story of Monuments in Rome and her Environs,’ Florence, 1864–5, 2 parts. 
 ‘A History of Ancient Christianity and Sacred Art in Italy,’ London, 1866. 
 ‘A History of Mediæval Christianity and Sacred Art in Italy, A.D. 900–1450. In Rome from 1350 to 1500,’ 1869–72, 2 vols. A sequel to the previous work. 
 ‘Historic and Monumental Rome,’ a handbook, London, 1874.

References

1817 births
1876 deaths
English archaeologists